Quick Objects is a powerful object–relational mapping tool for Microsoft .NET Framework, a built in framework for business logic and validation. The architecture for Quick Objects is different from other ORM tools (See: List of object–relational mapping software). Focus of Quick Objects to provide the advantages of code reuse, code generation and object relational mapping in a single tool set.

LINQ is fully supported and it can be used against any of the supported databases. Classes generated by Quick Objects are ready for Web Services, Windows Communication Foundation and Remoting. Comprehensive data access and modification capabilities are complemented by an object model that allows the developer to specify and control every aspect of the CRUD operations.

History

Quick Objects 
On September 15, 2008, Version 4.2 was released which included enhanced support for Windows Forms visual databinding.

On September 1, 2008, Version 4.1 was released with support for Microsoft .NET Compact Framework.

On August 1, 2008, Version 4.0 was released with several new features. VistaDB, Microsoft Access and MySQL were added to the list of supported databases. Quick Object's designer added support for adding multiple custom templates for code generation. V4.0 also added support for LINQ and enabled the capability to specify queries in LINQ and run them against any of the supported databases.

On April 7, 2008, Version 3.5 was released with a new free edition of the product called Community Edition. In addition to the Community Edition, the Quick Objects Designer also added a visual validation designer. Business Logic Framework also introduced support for databases with multiple schemas, and introduced support for aggregate sub queries.

On March 3, 2008, Version 3.3 was released with support for Visual Studio 2008.

On October 30, 2007, a major release of Quick Objects V3 was released with the addition of the validation framework among other features. V3 also introduced support for disconnected mode and delayed synchronization. A new component called Quick Objects Data Source for ASP.NET was introduced in V3 as well.

On April 25, 2007, Quick Objects version 2.2 was released to the public.

Quick Objects components for .NET Framework

Quick Objects features

Supported database servers 
 Microsoft SQL Server / SQL CE
 Microsoft Access
 Oracle
 MySQL

See also
 List of object–relational mapping software

References

External links
 

Object-relational mapping